Renegade Nation is a music and entertainment company founded by Steven Van Zandt in 1999. The company focuses on artist management, production, live events, and distribution. It is also the parent company of Van Zandt's independent record label, Wicked Cool Records, and distributes Little Steven's Underground Garage.

History 
After Van Zandt's 1989 album Revolution lacked attention, his then label, RCA, turned down the demos for his next album, Born Again Savage, stating that "rock music was over." By 1994, due to the shift in popularity from rock to pop music, and his lack of a recording contract, he started to record Born Again Savage with U2 bassist Adam Clayton, eventually resulting in the creation of his own record label.

After the success of the Underground Garage radio show, which first premiered on April 6, 2002, Van Zandt expanded the company to include radio, live events, TV, artist management, and a subsidiary record label, Wicked Cool Records.

Musician and longtime friend of Van Zandt, Jean Beauvoir, took a break to serve as CEO and Managing Director of the company for six and a half years, from 2004 to 2011, before returning to performing.

In July 2013, it was announced that Marc Brickman would become the head of Renegade Management. Van Zandt made the decision after hiring him to put together the lighting for The Rascals' Once Upon a Dream tour.

Imprints

Wicked Cool Records 
Van Zandt's record label, Wicked Cool Records, was created in 2004 with the purpose of supporting new rock bands, inspired by the Underground Garage radio show. The majority of the bands signed to the label have experience with smaller, independent labels, with rare exceptions. The label also reissues some albums that have not been previously commercially successful. In 2007, Wicked Cool had a partnership with retailer Best Buy so that albums heard on Underground Garage could be easily found in stores. The first album to be released by Wicked Cool Records was Davie Allan and the Arrows' Fuzz for the Holidays, released on December 14, 2004. Other early releases include Strange Magic by The Charms, The Mindbending Sounds of...The Chesterfield Kings, Mastermind by the Cocktail Slippers, and the tribute album CBGB Forever. The label is also known for its compilation albums Little Steven's Underground Garage presents The Coolest Songs in the World. Halloween and Christmas-themed compilations were also released beginning in 2008. In 2017, Van Zandt's album, Soulfire, was released, marking his first new solo album since 1999. Currently, the label has 29 artists signed to it, the newest of which is The Dollyrots, which signed with the label in 2018.

Renegade Radio 
Renegade Radio focuses on publishing Underground Garage and Sirius XM's Outlaw Country.

Renegade Circus 
Renegade Circus focuses on putting on live shows, including The Rascals' Once Upon a Dream, "Underground Garage A Go-Go," "Outlaw Country Cruise," and other various live shows related to Underground Garage.

Renegade TV 
Renegade TV does television and streaming production services. They produced Van Zandt's original Netflix series, Lilyhammer, from 2012–2014, the MTV Underground Garage National Battle of the Bands, the VH1 special Cheap Trick or Treat Halloween Ball, and the first ESPN New Year's Eve Concert special.

Renegade Books 
Renegade Books focuses on printing books for certain occasions, including a Soulfire songbook.

Renegade Management 
This subsidiary focuses on artist management.

Renegade Theatre 
Created in 2006, Renegade Theatre focuses on producing Broadway shows, including Eddie Brigati: After the Rascals, Vincent Pastore's play Crazy Horse, and This One's for Jack, a tribute to Renegade Theatre member Jack Ferry, who passed away at age 42. Van Zandt's wife, Maureen Van Zandt, is co-artistic director of Renegade Theatre.

Fuzztopia 
Van Zandt also created a music website entitled Fuzztopia to let musicians help each other and dubbed it "the first international music website." Although the website no longer exists, its YouTube channel is still available.

Wicked Cool Records roster

Current artists 

 The Breakers
 Brian Ray
 The Chesterfield Kings
 The Chevelles
 Cocktail Slippers
 The Contrast
 The Coolies
 The Dollyrots
 The Empty Hearts
 The Jellybricks
 Jesse Malin
 Ko and the Knockouts
 Kris Rodgers and the Dirty Gems
 Kurt Baker
 The Launderettes
 The Len Price 3
 Little Steven and the Disciples of Soul
 The Maggots
 Michael Des Barres
 Palmyra Delran
 Prima Donna
 Richard and the Young Lions
 Ryan Hamilton and the Harlequin Ghosts
 Soraia
 Spanking Charlene
 The Shadows of Knight
 Steve Conte
 The Urges
 The Woggles
 Wyldlife

Previous artists 

 The Charms
 Crown of Thorns
 Davie Allan and the Arrows
 The Grip Weeds
 Hawaii Mud Bombers
 Jarvis Humby
 Locksley
 The Novaks
 Outrageous Cherry
 The Rascals
 The Stabilisers

References 

1999 establishments in New York City
Steven Van Zandt
American record labels